The Tokyo Boys was a Japanese American gang founded in Manzanar Concentration camp during World War II. They were split into three groups/ranks, The Kibei Boys (Japanese-Americans from Japan), Issei Boys (1st generation Japanese-Americans), and the Nisei Boys (2nd generation Japanese-Americans).

History 
During World War II, then current American president Franklin D. Roosevelt passed Executive Order 9066 which infamously criminalized the being of any Japanese person or person of Japanese ancestry, and forcefully relocated all Japanese and Japanese-Americans into concentration camps, and stripped them of American Constitutional Rights. The most infamous of these camps was Manzanar, where over 100,000 Japanese Americans were jailed. Due to the cruel, unfair, and harsh conditions, a group of rebellious Japanese youths and adults quickly formed a gang. At first there was a power struggle between other gangs in the camp, however, after the Manzanar Riots, almost all gangs united into the Tokyo Boys a.k.a. Manzanar Black Dragons.

Throughout the lifetime of the camp, The Tokyo Boys were not involved in high-level crimes, but rather trivial offenses such as stealing extra rations and harassing non-Japanese prisoners.

Post-Manzanar History 
After the Japanese-Americans were released from Manzanar, many went to California to work legally and reintegrate into American society. However, due to the time period (1940s-1950s), many Japanese Americans couldn't find work, and even if they could, it wouldn't be enough to support themselves and their families. This combined with the scars of internment and rampant racism has caused many Japanese-Americans to this day remain under the poverty line in places along the West Coast (California, Nevada, and Oregon). Due to their socio-economic position, many members of the Tokyo Boys continued their lifestyle of crime after their release, however, as time progressed, so did the severity of their crimes.

References 

Asian-American gangs
Gangs in California
1942 establishments in California
Japanese-American culture in California